"Bernie Clifton's Dressing Room" is the second episode of the fourth series of the British black comedy anthology television programme Inside No. 9. Written by Steve Pemberton and Reece Shearsmith, the episode was directed by Graeme Harper and was first shown on 9 January 2018, on BBC Two. It stars Pemberton, Shearsmith and Sian Gibson.

References

External links

"Bernie Clifton's Dressing Room" at BBC Programmes
"Bernie Clifton's Dressing Room" at the British Comedy Guide

2018 British television episodes
Inside No. 9 episodes